Karl Lowe (born 17 September 1984) is a New Zealand rugby union footballer. Lowe is from Hastings and attended St Johns College and Hastings Boys High School. Lowe's younger brother is Jonah Lowe.

Career

Club rugby 
In 2004, Lowe debuted for Hawke's Bay against the Bay of Plenty Steamers. Lowe went on to play 100 first class games for the province between 2004 to 2013.

In 2009, Lowe was selected for the Hurricanes, where he spent 5 years playing for the franchise.

In 2014, Lowe left for offshore and signed a 2-year contract with Japanese club Canon Eagles, in the Top League.

For the 2016–17 season, Lowe signed with French rugby club Provence Rugby, in Aix en Provence, in the south of France.

International 
Lowe was selected in the 2009 Junior All Blacks for the Pacific Nations Cup.
Lowe was part of the 2010 and 2012 Maori All Blacks tours.

Lowe scored a try against Ireland, in the Maori All Blacks' win in 2010.

References

External links
 Hurricanes Profile

1984 births
Hurricanes (rugby union) players
Hawke's Bay rugby union players
Yokohama Canon Eagles players
New Zealand rugby union players
Rugby union flankers
Living people
Māori All Blacks players
Rugby union players from Hastings, New Zealand
New Zealand expatriate rugby union players
New Zealand expatriate sportspeople in Japan
Expatriate rugby union players in Japan